This list of fossil molluscs described in 2022 is a list of new taxa of fossil molluscs that were described during the year 2022, as well as other significant discoveries and events related to molluscan paleontology that occurred in 2022.

Ammonites

New taxa

Ammonite research
 Mironenko & Naugolnykh (2022) describe a collection of cephalopod jaws from the Permian (Artinskian) Divjinskian Formation (Sverdlovsk Oblast, Russia), intepreted as likely fossil material of goniatitid ammonites belonging to the genus Uraloceras, and infer from the anatomy of the studied jaws that representatives of the genus Uraloceras were likely active predators.
 A study on the morphological change through ontogeny of beyrichitine ammonites from the Anisian of Nevada is published by Bischof, Schlüter & Lehmann (2022).
 A study aiming to determine whether the environmental changes around the Triassic–Jurassic boundary influenced development of septal thickness in ammonites, as well aiming to determine the relation between septal thickness and paleolatitudinal occurrences, and whether ontogenetic septal thickness-trajectories reflected paleogeographic origin or phylogenetic relationships of ammonites, is published by Weber et al. (2022).
 A study on the hydrodynamic properties of shells of Late Triassic and Early Jurassic ammonites is published by Hebdon et al. (2022).
 A study on the functional morphology of ammonites from the Middle Triassic to the Early Jurassic, reevaluating possible causes of an overall shift of ammonite shell forms during the studied periods, is published by Hebdon et al. (2022), who interpret their findings as indicating that the trade-offs between coasting efficiency, volume accretion per unit surface area accreted and diameter accretion per unit of surface area (three factors proposed as explanations of the shift of shell forms) were identical in the Triassic and in the Jurassic.
 Jaws of ammonites belonging to the Boreal family Polyptychitidae, with lower jaws closely resembling jaws of craspeditids, cardioceratids and hoplitoids, are described for the first time from the Valanginian of Russia by Mironenko & Mitta (2022).
 A study on changes of septal spacing between succeeding chambers of the shell of Gaudryceras tenuiliratum during its ontogeny is published by Kawakami, Uchiyama & Wani (2022).
 A study on the impact of the conch shape on ammonite locomotion, based on data obtained from tests of 3D-printed, biomimetic robots representing the oxycone morphology (based on Sphenodiscus lobatus and S. lenticularis), the serpenticone morphology (based on Dactylioceras commune), the sphaerocone morphology (based on Goniatites crenistria) and the morphospace center, is published by Peterman & Ritterbush (2022).

Other cephalopods

New taxa

Other cephalopod research
 A study on the phylogenetic relationships of Cambrian and Ordovician cephalopods is published by Pohle et al. (2022).
 Putative tentaculitoid Iwakiella ichiroi is reinterpreted as a sphaerorthoceratid orthocerid cephalopod by Niko (2022).
 A study on the identity of enigmatic black amorphous fossils often associated with belemnoid remains, based on the analysis of fossil material from the Upper Triassic (Carnian) Polzberg Lagerstätte (Austria), is published by Lukeneder & Lukeneder (2022), who interpret the enigmatic fossils as likely representing the preservation of a mineralized and secondarily carbonized cephalic-ocular-arm-cartilage complex of the belemnoid Phragmoteuthis bisinuata.
 A study on structures interpreted by Eduard Suess as beaks of Phragmoteuthis bisinuata is published by Doguzhaeva et al. (2022), who reinterpret the studied structures as cartilaginous remains of a prey, presumably juvenile fish; the authors also report a gladius of a previously unknown Carnian teuthid from the Cave del Predil (Italy), possibly similar to the Permian taxon Glochinomorpha stifeli, as well as an upper beak of a coleoid from the Anisian Buchenstein Formation (Italy), demonstrating typical coleoid upper beak morphology and composition, and interpreted by the authors as likely indicative of similar upper beak structure in P. bisinuata. Their interpretation of purported beaks of P. bisinuata as remains of a prey is subsequently contested by Lukeneder & Lukeneder (2022).
 Belemnite species Liobelus acrei, otherwise known from the latest Jurassic and Early Cretaceous of the Boreal Realm, is reported from the Valanginian of the Vocontian Basin (France) by Mutterlose, Picollier & Dzyuba (2022), who interpret this finding as evidence of an isolated immigration of belemnites from the north in the early Valanginian, and establish two taxonomically different faunas of Tethyan belemnites.
 A study on the age of belemnites from the lower Santonian "Sponge horizon" of the Mozhzhelloovrazhnaya Formation in the Lower Volga region between Saratov and Volgograd (Russia), some of which are interpreted as redeposited from middle and upper Coniacian deposits on the basis of strontium, carbon and oxygen isotope data (with the first representatives of the genus Belemnitella interpreted as late Coniacian in age), is published by Zakharov et al. (2022).
 Revision of the type specimens of Eothinoceras americanum is published by Evans & Cichowolski (2022), who restrict the genus Eothinoceras to the type species, and propose a new scheme for classification of the genera belonging to the order Cyrtocerinida.
 A study on the distribution of nautiloids throughout the Cenozoic is published by Kiel, Goedert & Tsai (2022), who interpret their findings as indicating that from the Oligocene onward nautiloids became extinct in areas where pinnipeds appeared, while cetaceans (with possible exception of simocetids and agorophiids) were not found to significantly affect the demise of nautiloids.
 Fossil material of "Kummelonautilus" taiwanum is described from the Miocene Houdongkeng Formation (Taiwan) by Goedert, Kiel & Tsai (2022), who provisionally transfer this species to the genus Nautilus, and review the fossil record of the genus Nautilus in the Indo-Pacific region.
 A study on the external and internal morphology, affinities and ecology of Vampyronassa rhodanica, based on data on soft tissue of specimens from the La Voulte-sur-Rhône (France), is published by Rowe et al. (2022).
 First cephalopod statoliths from the Lower Cretaceous of Poland and United Kingdom are described by Pindakiewicz et al. (2022), who compare Mesozoic statoliths to those of extant cephalopods, and find the closest resemblance between Mesozoic forms and statoliths of extant idiosepiids.
 A study on the fossil material of Belosaepia from the Egemkapel Clay Member of the Tielt Formation and the Roubaix Clay Member of the Kortrijk Formation (Belgium), applying micro-CT imaging to the studied fossils, is published by Goolaerts et al. (2022), who identify growth lines in the studied fossils, and interpret their findings as indicating that the studied material belongs to representatives of a single species (B. tricarinata).

Bivalves

New taxa

Bivalve research
 Late Triassic bivalves are identified for the first time in olistostromes from the Sêwa Formation in the Riganpeicuo area (Tibet, China) by Xiao et al. (2022).
 A study on the impact of the Triassic–Jurassic extinction event on the body-size distribution of bivalves, based on data from three study sites in the United Kingdom, is published by Opazo & Twitchett (2022).
 Wolkenstein (2022) presents evidence of abundance and diversity in the color patterns of Pleuronectites laevigatus from the Middle Triassic Muschelkalk of Central Europe.
 Asato, Nakayama & Imai (2022) study color patterns of freshwater bivalves from the Lower Cretaceous Kitadani Formation (Japan), providing evidence of the presence of similar shell color patterns in extant and Early Cretaceous bivalves.

Gastropods

New taxa

Gastropod research
 A study on transitions from water to land throughout the evolutionary history of gastropods is published by Vermeij & Watson-Zink (2022).
 A study on changes in gastropod diversity at the genus/subgenus level from the Norian to the Pliensbachian is published by Ferrari & Hautmann (2022), who report that gastropods lost 56% of genera/subgenera during the Triassic–Jurassic extinction event, which was much more than the average loss of marine life at the time, and attempt to determine potential causes of the end-Triassic extinctions of gastropods.
 A study aiming to determine the drivers of diversification for European freshwater gastropods over the past 100 million years is published by Neubauer et al. (2022).
 A study aiming to determine the factors which caused the diversification of European freshwater gastropods in the Late Cretaceous is published by Neubauer & Harzhauser (2022).
 Revision of the fossil material of Ancistrolepis from the Eocene (Ypresian) Llajas Formation (California, United States), representing the oldest occurrence of this genus reported to date, is published by Squires (2022).

Other molluscs

New taxa

Other mollusc research
 Revision of the oldest known specimens of Jinonicella kolebabai from the Middle Ordovician strata of Ukraine and Belarus is published by Gubanov et al. (2022), who report the preservation of growth lines which were previously documented only in Silurian specimens.
 New information on the anatomy of Typhloesus wellsi is presented by Conway Morris & Caron (2022), who consider it plausible that Typhloesus was a pelagic mollusc with possible affinities with gastropods.

References 

2022 in paleontology
Paleomalacology